Pääkkönen is a Finnish surname. Notable people with the surname include:

Jasper Pääkkönen (born 1980), Finnish television and film actor and film producer
Lasse Paakkonen (born 1986), Finnish Olympic cross country skier 
Seppo Pääkkönen (born 1957), Finnish actor

See also
Murder of Urban Höglin and Heidi Paakkonen

Finnish-language surnames